Events in the year 2023 in Switzerland.

Incumbents 

 President of the Swiss Confederation: Alain Berset
 President of the National Council: Irène Kälin
 President of the Swiss Council of States: Thomas Hefti

Events

Scheduled 

 5 February: Avalanches kill eight tourists in the Alps.
 2023 Swiss federal election

Arts and entertainment 

 76th Locarno Film Festival August 2 – 12

Sports 

 August 1 – 12 – 2023 IFSC Climbing World Championships
 UEFA Euro 2024 qualifying Group I
 2022–23 in Swiss football
 2022–23 Swiss Promotion League
 2022–23 Swiss Challenge League
 2022–23 Swiss Super League
 2022–23 Swiss Women's Super League
 2022–23 Swiss Cup

References 

 
2020s in Switzerland
Years of the 21st century in Switzerland
Switzerland
Switzerland